The Confederation of Ilocano Association, Incorporated, Samahang Ilokano (CIAI-SI) or Samahang Ilokano (SI) is a fraternity and sorority composed of students from colleges and universities in the northern part of the Philippines. Members are either of Ilocano lineage and/or have the capability of speaking and understanding the Ilokano language.

Samahang Ilokano was founded in the late 1940s as a fraternity to unite Ilocano speaking students. Ilocano speaking students from Northern Luzon provinces would pursue higher education in universities away from home and seek fellow Ilocanos for company and protection.

Soon enough the fraternity grew in number, which attracted scrutiny from other fraternities. Growth of member population also sparked uncontrollable brawls and riots, some of which landed members in prison. The Genuine Ilocano gills (GIG) was formed as a group for SI members who were incarcerated, and soon accepted members from within the prison.

Power struggles within the fraternity led to further separation of members. Hence, the birth of another faction now known as United Ilocandia Fraternity/Sorority (UI). The lack of organization created tension between the three groups

Unity and expansion
During martial law, the leaders and founders of the different groups agreed to unite the three organizations. This led to the creation of an umbrella organization, registered with the Securities and Exchange Commission under the name "Confederation of Ilocano Association, Incorporated" as a non-stock, non-profit and non-dividend corporation. Members of UI and GIG often do not use CIAUI or CIAGIG, and instead prefer their respective original faction names.

Most members of CIASI became professionals, which gave the opportunity for the group to diversify into factions of the following types within the organization: international, military, professional, women's auxiliary, out-of-school youths, and students.

Despite significant changes within the structure, the ultimate purpose of the Samahang Ilokano still stands: an organization to cradle the Ilocanos.
 The dove symbolizes peace, freedom and friendship.
 The laurel leaves highlight our aspirations for academic and professional excellence.
 The gear provides the aspirations for the development of our potentials in various fields of endeavor.
 The snake symbolizes new life, the power to conquer fear, and the ability to survive.
 The arrow with its up right position symbolize the ability to stand up against all the challenges.

Student societies in the Philippines
Fraternities and sororities in the Philippines
Student organizations established in the 1940s
1940s establishments in the Philippines